Edward Brennan (1 August 1920 – September 1988) was an Irish Fianna Fáil politician. He unsuccessfully contested the Dublin North-East constituency at the 1981 general election, but was then elected to Dáil Éireann as a Teachta Dála (TD) at the February 1982 general election. He lost his seat at the November 1982 general election, and was an unsuccessful candidate in Dublin North-East at the 1987 general election.

References

1920 births
1988 deaths
Fianna Fáil TDs
Members of the 23rd Dáil
Politicians from County Dublin